The name Pamela has been used for eleven tropical cyclones worldwide, one in the Eastern Pacific Ocean and ten in the Western Pacific.

In the Eastern Pacific:  
 Hurricane Pamela (2021) – made landfall in Sinaloa, Mexico, as a Category 1 hurricane.

In the Western Pacific: 
 Typhoon Pamela (1954) (T5416)
 Tropical Storm Pamela (1958) (T5823, 28W)
 Typhoon Pamela (1961) (T6118, 50W)
 Tropical Storm Pamela (1964) (T6419, 24W)
 Typhoon Pamela (1966) (T6630, 38W, Aning)
 Tropical Storm Pamela (1970) (T7004, 03W, Klaring)
 Typhoon Pamela (1972) (T7227, 29W, Toyang)
 Typhoon Pamela (1976) (T7608, 06W) – struck Guam as a Category 4 super typhoon.
 Tropical Storm Pamela (1979) (T7916, 20W) – remained out to sea.
 Typhoon Pamela (1982) (T8225, 27W, Aning) – struck the Philippines.

See also 
 Cyclone Pam (disambiguation), a similar name which has been used in the South Pacific Ocean.

Pacific typhoon set index articles
Pacific hurricane set index articles